Hoffman Farm is a historic farm complex located at Keedysville, Washington County, Maryland, United States. It consists of an 1840s Greek Revival style two-story brick dwelling, adjacent brick slave quarters, a Federal-style stone house built about 1810 over a spring, a frame wagon shed, a log hog barn, and a frame forebay bank barn. The farm buildings were used as a hospital during the American Civil War in Battle of Antietam from the day of the battle on September 17, 1862, and through the following month. Over 800 men were hospitalized in the barn, house, outbuildings, and grounds.

The Hoffman Farm was listed on the National Register of Historic Places in 1997.

References

External links
, including photo from 1997, at Maryland Historical Trust
Historic American Buildings Survey documentation, filed under Keedysville Road, Sharpsburg vicinity, Washington, MD:

Farms on the National Register of Historic Places in Maryland
Houses in Washington County, Maryland
Federal architecture in Maryland
Greek Revival houses in Maryland
Historic American Buildings Survey in Maryland
National Register of Historic Places in Washington County, Maryland
Slave cabins and quarters in the United States